Wolfgang Huber (born 11 November 1940 in Mannheim) is a German specialist in internal medicine, nephrology, and environmental medicine.

Biography 
After completing his medical studies at Heidelberg University in 1965, Huber was assistant physician and research assistant at the University Hospital Mannheim, belonging to the University of Heidelberg, from 1967 to 1975. In 1974 he received his license to become a specialist in internal medicine, and in 1976 he was awarded the teaching license ("Venia Legendi") for this subject. From 1975 to 1998, Huber worked as senior physician in the hospital "SRH Kurpfalzkrankenhaus Heidelberg" in the Nephrology/Hemodialysis department. The sub-area designation "nephrologist" was recognized in 1979. From 1986 to 2005 Huber was adjunct professor at Heidelberg University Faculty of Medicine in Mannheim.

In a report on Frankfurt wood preservative processes, Huber proposed a connection between biocidal constituents of various wood preservatives and immune disorders.

From 1995 onwards, Huber was given the additional title of “environmental medicine” and from 1998 to February 2021 he ran a private practice in Wieblingen, a district of Heidelberg. As a reviewer, he prepared reports in pension and occupational disease procedures, vaccination reports, reports in severely disabled persons, law procedures and private reports until 2017.

In 2000, he was awarded the Federal Cross of Merit on ribbon, in 2008 with the citizen's badge of the city of Heidelberg and in 2017 with the Federal Cross of Merit 1st class for his decades of commitment to environmental medicine and senior citizen work.

Publications (selection) 
Huber published over 130 publications, including a small selection below:

References

External links 
 Homepage of Wolfgang Huber

20th-century German physicians
21st-century German physicians
Officers Crosses of the Order of Merit of the Federal Republic of Germany
Academic staff of Heidelberg University
Men in West Germany
1940 births
Living people